John Rashleigh may refer to:
 John Rashleigh (1554–1624) of Menabilly, MP for Fowey in 1588 and 1597, and High Sheriff of Cornwall in 1608
 John Rashleigh (1619–1693) of Coombe, MP for Fowey from 1661 to 1679
 John Colman Rashleigh (1772–1847), High Sheriff of Cornwall